The 1984 Utah gubernatorial election was held on November 6, 1984. Republican nominee Norman H. Bangerter defeated Democratic nominee Wayne Owens with 55.87% of the vote, becoming Utah's first Republican governor in 20 years.

Primary elections
Primary elections were held on August 21, 1984.

Democratic primary

Republican primary

General election

Candidates
Wayne Owens, Democratic
Norman H. Bangerter, Republican
L. S. Brown, American

Results

References

Bibliography
 

1984
Utah
Gubernatorial